is a Japanese manga series written and illustrated by Mitsurō Kubo. It was serialized in 2011 in Weekly Shōnen Magazine published by Kodansha until reaching its conclusion in 2014. It was adapted into a Japanese television drama series in the summer of 2014.

Synopsis 
Kin'ichirō Imamura, a high school senior, prepares to graduate with no friends and having never participated in extracurricular activities. An accident on the last day of school somehow sends Imamura and Akira Fujieda, a popular girl in Imamura's graduating class, back in time to their first day of high school. Imamura seizes the opportunity for a second chance to improve his high school life, and joins the school's troubled ōendan club.

Characters 

The protagonist of the series. Assumed to be a delinquent by his classmates because of his appearance, he was a loner throughout high school and joined no school clubs. On his last day of school, he recalls a memory of the captain of his school's now-defunct ōendan singing the school anthem. He attempts to break into the club's former office, though he instead falls down a flight of stairs and wakes up three years in the past, on his first day of high school. Recalling how the ōendan club was disbanded during his time in high school, he joins the club and vows to save it.

A popular girl in Imamura's class. She witnesses Imamura breaking into the ōendan's office and assumes him to be a thief, but falls down a flight of stairs when running to seek help. Like Imamura, she is sent back in time to her first day of high school. 

The captain of the school's ōendan. She is the sole member of the club, having driven away the other members with her stubbornness and extreme work ethic. When Imamura joins the ōendan, he helps her to regather the club's old members.

The captain of the school's cheerleading squad. She greatly despises the ōendan, believing them to be old-fashioned.

 The school's guidance counselor, and the ōendan's faculty advisor.

Media

Manga
Again!! has been collected as twelve tankōbon published by Kodansha.

Volume List

References

External links
 Official drama website 
 

2014 comics endings
2014 Japanese television series debuts
2014 Japanese television series endings
Kodansha manga
Manga adapted into television series
Shōnen manga